The 2005–06 Santosh Trophy (known as the 60th Air India Express Santosh Trophy 2005–06 for sponsorship reasons) was the 60th edition of the Santosh Trophy. The tournament was held from 4 to 21 November 2005 in Kerala.

Goa won the Santosh Trophy 2005–06 for the fourth time after defeating Maharashtra in the 2005 final at Jawaharlal Nehru Stadium, Kochi after 15 years. Host Kerala claimed third spot after defeating Punjab.

Teams

Automatically qualified to the group stage 

30 States / UT teams of India along with Services and Railways with total of 32 teams participated in the tournament
The defending champions Kerala, runners-up Punjab along with last year's losing semi-finalists Services and Manipur receive automatic qualification into the Quarter-final stage.

Qualification round entry

Stadiums and locations

Qualifying rounds
Qualifying round held from 4 to 10 November at the venues  Chandrasekharan Nair Stadium, Thiruvananthapuram  and Municipal Corporation Stadium, Kozhikode. 28 teams participated in qualifying rounds for Quarter final berth.

Cluster I - Calicut

Cluster II - Thiruvananthapuram

Cluster III - Thiruvananthapuram

Cluster IV - Calicut

Cluster V - Thiruvananthapuram

Cluster VI - Calicut

Cluster VII - Calicut

Cluster VIII -Thiruvananthapuram

Quarterfinal League
Quarterfinal rounds held from 11 to 17 November at the venue Jawaharlal Nehru Stadium, Kochi. Cheer girls, helicopter fly, sky diving, cultural programmes and mass drill was held to the kick-off of the main leg of the 60th Air India Express-Santosh Trophy national football tournament at Kochi on 11 November 2005. 4500 students from 25 schools and three colleges in the City lined up for mass drills, folk dances, traditional art forms while another 1000 students conducted special balloon display.

Group A

Group B

Group C

Group D

Semi-finals

Third place play-off

Final

Awards
Best Player: Nicholas Rodrigues

Statistics

Prizes
The Kerala Chief Minister, Oommen Chandy gave away the trophies. Besides the top prize and a cheque of Rs. 5 lakhs, the winning team also received Rs. 1 lakh announced by the Goa Sports Minister, Pandurang Madkikar .

Top scorers

Controversy
In a Group D match between Goa and Manipur on 17 November 2005, the referee Shaji C. Kurian allowed Goa to restart the game even as most of the Manipur players were celebrating Tomba Singh's goal in the 87th minute from a free kick. With the Manipur players unsettled for restart, Climax Lawrence rode on a break from the right and scored past Manipur goalkeeper Ingobi Singh. The Manipuri players argued with referee Kurian, disputing the restart. Police was called in due to be some shoving and pushing between players and there was some argument between the Manipur players and the local police. Game has only resumed after Manipur's coach Ekendra Singh and manager Dinamani Singh entered the ground and asked Manipur players to finish off the game. Even though the match ended in a tie, Goa advanced to the semifinals with their superior goal difference in Group D. Immediately after the incident, the Manipur team manager lodged a complaint contending violation of Rule No. 8 of the Laws of the Game, and Article No. 15 of the Regulation of the Championship.

The All Manipur Football Association decided to boycott the national Under-19 and Under-14 football tournaments organized by the All India Football Federation in protest against a referee's decision People of Manipur gave a rousing welcome to the players and officials of the State team which participated in the 60th Air India Express Santosh trophy football Tournament on their arrival at Imphal. To protest the biased decision of the referee, Manipur Students Federation had organised only sit-in-protest demonstration and imposed a 22-hour general strike on the day the final match. The All India Football Federation (AIFF) on 18 December 2005 decided to retain Goa as the champions of the Santosh Trophy rejecting Manipur's appeal, which had asked the AIFF to strip the champions of the title.

Telecast
Zee Sports telecasted the 16 matches from the quarterfinals onwards live. John Helm and Russell Osman have been hired as commentators. The telecast packages included preview and review shows, half time match analysis. Music and dance performances by renowned bands during the half time and in between the two matches. Special performance by Zebra's was there to entertain the crowds before the start of each match. Zee provided soccer fans with the latest team news, match scores, statistics and player profiles, as well as exclusive player interviews and photo galleries.

References

2005-06
2005–06 in Indian football
2005–06 domestic association football cups